Psichotoe duvaucelii is a moth in the subfamily Arctiinae. It was described by Jean Baptiste Boisduval in 1829. It is found in India (Karachi, Calcutta, Assam) and Myanmar.

References

Moths described in 1829
Arctiinae